Vladimir Temelkov (born 26 March 1980 in Veles, Republic of Macedonia) is a Macedonian handball player who plays for Handball Käerjeng.

In 2009 Vladimir was a member of the Macedonian national handball team which finished 11th on the 2009 World Men's Handball Championship in Croatia and he scored 35 goals. Three years later in 2012 he played on the European Men's Handball Championship in Serbia when Macedonian national handball team finished 5th.

For the Macedonian national handball team he played 78 matches and scored 243 goals.

References

External links
http://www.handball-planet.com/vladimir-temelkov-from-germany-to-luxembourg/

1980 births
Macedonian male handball players
Living people
Sportspeople from Veles, North Macedonia
Macedonian expatriate sportspeople in Germany
Expatriate sportspeople in Germany
Expatriate sportspeople in Luxembourg
Expatriate handball players